Lac Couture is a lake in Northern Quebec, Canada. It is located near Hudson Bay in the Kativik territory.  The lake is approximately 150 meters deep.

Most of the lake covers an 8 km in diameter impact crater. The crater is estimated to be 430 ± 25 million years old (Silurian). Breccia, suggesting impact origin, is present in boulders at the surface on islands around the perimeter of the lake.  There is also a 25-meter central uplift in the lake floor, suggesting complex crater morphology.

References

External links 
 Aerial Exploration of the Couture Structure

Impact craters of Quebec
Silurian impact craters
Silurian Quebec
.craters
Impact crater lakes
Landforms of Nord-du-Québec